Kourosh Bagheri (born 21 September 1977 in Kermanshah) is a former Iranian weightlifter who won the gold medal in the Men's 94 kg weight class at the 2001 World Weightlifting Championships.
Bagheri was also holding the Asian Record of Snatch in 94 kg at the 2000 Summer Olympics in Sydney, as well as the Asian Record of Total in 94 kg at the 2001 World Weightlifting Championships.  
He was the head coach of Iran's weightlifting team at the London Olympics in summer 2012 in which he coached Iranian weightlifters who won three gold and two silver medals.

Major results

References

External links
 
 
 
 
 

1977 births
Living people
World Weightlifting Championships medalists
Iranian male weightlifters
Olympic weightlifters of Iran
Weightlifters at the 2000 Summer Olympics
Asian Games silver medalists for Iran
Sportspeople from Kermanshah
Asian Games medalists in weightlifting
Weightlifters at the 1998 Asian Games
Weightlifters at the 2002 Asian Games
Recipients of the Order of Courage (Iran)
Medalists at the 1998 Asian Games
Medalists at the 2002 Asian Games
20th-century Iranian people
21st-century Iranian people